Sanjay Balmuchu (born 5 January 1992) is an Indian professional footballer who plays as a defender for Mumbai City FC in the Indian Super League.

Career

Churchill Brothers
After graduating from the Tata Football Academy, Balmuchu was announced as a Churchill Brothers player on 13 July 2012 for their I-League campaign. He made his professional debut for the club on 4 January 2013 against Shillong Lajong. He started and played the whole match as Churchill Brothers won 6–0. While with the club, Balmuchu was a part of the 2012–13 I-League winning team, and the 2013–14 Indian Federation Cup sides.

After Churchill Brothers were expelled from the I-League, Balmuchu continued to play for the club in the Goa Professional League and Durand Cup. He eventually left Churchill Brothers to sign for Mohammedan of the I-League 2nd Division.

Mohun Bagan
After some time with Mohammedan, Balmuchu signed for reigning I-League champions, Mohun Bagan, on 24 June 2015.

International
Balmuchu was selected into the initial squad for the India U23 side in the 2014 Asian Games.

Career statistics

Honours

Club

Chennaiyin FC
 Indian Super League: 2017-18 Champions

References

1992 births
Living people
Indian footballers
Churchill Brothers FC Goa players
Mohammedan SC (Kolkata) players
Mohun Bagan AC players
Association football midfielders
Footballers from Jharkhand
I-League players
Goa Professional League players
I-League 2nd Division players